LC10 was the original name given to a series of very small three-cylinder, two-stroke engines built by Suzuki Motor Corporation in the 1960s and 1970s. They were used in a number of kei class automobiles and light trucks. The LC10 and its derivatives did not completely replace the FE and L50 two-cylinders, which continued to be used mainly for light commercials. The LC10 engine was developed together with the Suzuki B100 engine, a   single-cylinder motorcycle engine which shared the same bore and stroke. For longevity and convenience, the LC10 received Suzuki's new "Posi-Force" auto-lubrication system, eliminating the need for pre-mixed fuel.

LC10

The engine was first seen in air-cooled form, equipped with three Mikuni VM carburettors, in the 1967 LC10 Suzuki Fronte 360. Originally developing , a  SS version soon appeared, with a stunning . For the conventionally laid out Fronte Van, Estate, and Custom a single carburettor version was used. For 1971, the LC10 engine received Suzuki's new self-lubricating "CCIS" system (Cylinder Crank Injection and Selmix).

In 1969, Japanese racing car manufacturer Nialco built a single-seater called the RQ which utilized the triple-carb LC10 engine and competed in the RQ ("Racing Quarterly") Minicar Racing Tournament. Their best result was a fourth in the 1969 meet at Fuji, with Kikuo Kaira (future co-founder of Tommy Kaira) at the wheel.

Applications:
 1967.04–1970.11 Suzuki Fronte 360
 1970.11–1973.07 Suzuki Fronte LC10 II ("Sting Ray" Fronte)
 1969.01–1972.03 Suzuki Fronte Van/Estate/Custom LS10/11, 
 1970.08–1971 Suzuki Fronte Hi-Custom LS11,

LC10W

In May 1971, as kei cars were becoming more and more sophisticated, a water-cooled version was presented. The air-cooled versions were soon relegated to use only in the cheapest versions, and disappeared entirely after 1973 as emissions standards became more stringent. The watercooled versions also had slightly better weight distribution (38/62 versus 37.5/62.5), due to the radiator being mounted up front. This, the LC10W, was the only engine ever to be installed in the iconic Suzuki Fronte Coupé, whether in domestic or export market cars. The new 1973-1976 "oval shell" Fronte received the new LC20 chassis code but retained the LC10W engine code.

From 1973 the LC10W engines also received Suzuki's SRIS (Suzuki Recycle Injection System), a method for lowering visible exhaust smoke by collecting and burning residual oil/gas lying in the bottom of the crank chambers. This was first seen on the Suzuki GT750, GT550, and GT380 motorcycles. In an effort to reduce CO, HC, and NOx emissions, the EPIC (Exhaust Port Ignition Cleaner) system was also installed.

Applications:
 1971.05–1973.07 Suzuki Fronte LC10 W
 1971.09–1976 Suzuki Fronte Coupé
 1973–1976.05 Suzuki Fronte LC20

LC50
A bored-out version  of the air-cooled LC10, called the LC50 in reference to its near half-litre displacement (actually ) appeared in January 1969. In street applications, this engine was only for export, and was only ever made with air cooling. Like its smaller brethren, the LC50 breathed through triple carburettors.

Water-cooled  triples were built for racing purposes, producing  at 9,000 rpm. These took part in the JAF Grand Prix Formula Junior class as well as "MR" (Minicar Racing) meets.

 1969.01–1970 Suzuki Fronte 500
 1970–1973.07 Suzuki Fronte 500/LC50 ("Sting Ray")

T4A
In response to the changed Kei car regulations taking effect on January 1, 1976, Suzuki developed a bored out and cleaner version of the LC10W, featuring Suzuki TC (Twin Catalyst, a double muffler in which uncombusted fuel was burned) emissions equipment. Sometime between 1973 and 1976 Suzuki had changed their system of naming engines, so this engine became the T4A. This meant that it was the first ("A") engine with a 0.4-litre displacement. The T4A was fairly short-lived (only used in the Fronte 7-S for a little over two years), and was soon replaced by an unrelated "full size" (550 cc) engine called the T5A/T5B. The emissions strangled T4A put out  at 4,500 rpm in its final "TC53" form: specific power was 54% of what a 1972 Fronte GT had managed.

 1976.05–1977.10 Suzuki Fronte 7-S SS10/SS12

See also
List of Suzuki engines

References

LC10
Two-stroke gasoline engines
Straight-three engines
Gasoline engines by model